Scott is a census-designated place and unincorporated community located in Bolivar County, Mississippi, United States on Mississippi Highway 1.

Scott was formerly home to three general stores.

A post office first began operation under the name Scott in 1907.

In 1927, Delta & Pine Land Company established its headquarters in Scott.

It was first named as a CDP in the 2020 Census which listed a population of 90.

Demographics

2020 census

Note: the US Census treats Hispanic/Latino as an ethnic category. This table excludes Latinos from the racial categories and assigns them to a separate category. Hispanics/Latinos can be of any race.

Education
It is a part of the West Bolivar Consolidated School District. It was formerly in the Benoit School District. The Benoit district merged into the West Bolivar district in 2014. The only K-12 school of the Benoit district, Ray Brooks School, operated until 2020. From 1986 until 2000 Benoit School District sent high school students to West Bolivar High School of the West Bolivar district.

Notable people
 Big Bill Broonzy, blues musician
 Geraldine Hines, Associate Justice of the Massachusetts Supreme Judicial Court from 2014 to 2017

Gallery

References

Unincorporated communities in Bolivar County, Mississippi
Unincorporated communities in Mississippi
Census-designated places in Bolivar County, Mississippi